Forest Lawn Memorial Gardens is a cemetery noted for the number of musicians' graves located within it.  It was established in 1960, and is located at 1150 Dickerson Pike in Goodlettsville, Tennessee, just north of Nashville. One area of the cemetery is designated as "Music Row" for the number of country music entertainers that are interred there, including three musicians who died in the 1963 plane crash with Patsy Cline as well as singer Jack Anglin who died in a car accident on his way to her funeral.

Notable interments
 David "Stringbean" Akeman (1915–1973), comedian, Old-Time banjo player
 Jack Anglin (1916–1963), musician
 Lloyd "Cowboy" Copas (1913–1963), musician
 Lefty Frizzell (1928–1975), singer/songwriter
 Hawkshaw Hawkins (1923–1963), musician
 Don Helms (1927–2008), steel guitarist
 Autry Inman (1929–1988), rockabilly musician
 Brother Oswald Kirby (1911–2002), musician
 Benny Martin (1928–2001), Bluegrass fiddler
 Roy Wiggins (1926–1999), steel guitarist

See also
 List of United States cemeteries

References

External links
 
 

Cemeteries in Tennessee
American country music